Franconia is a town in Grafton County, New Hampshire, United States. The population was 1,083 at the 2020 census. Set in the White Mountains, Franconia is home to the northern half of Franconia Notch State Park. Parts of the White Mountain National Forest are in the eastern and southern portions of the town. The Appalachian Trail crosses the town.

History

The town was first granted in 1764 by colonial Governor Benning Wentworth as "Franconia", a name widely applied to the region by 1760 due to the terrain's resemblance to the Franconian Switzerland in the region of Franconia in Germany. Upon claims that a settlement was not made within the time prescribed under the terms of the charter, it was regranted in 1772 by his nephew, Governor John Wentworth, as "Morristown". Sometime between 1779 and 1782, after a legal battle over the two grants, the first grant was recognized and the original name of the town was resumed.

The town sits on a rich iron deposit, and the region once produced pig iron and bar iron for farm tools and cast iron ware.

Franconia is home to the Cannon Mountain Aerial Tramway, which rises to the  summit of Cannon Mountain. Built in 1938, it was the first passenger aerial tramway in North America. From the time of its construction in 1938 to its retirement in 1980, the original tramway carried 6,581,338 passengers to the summit of Cannon Mountain. The original tramway was replaced by a new 80-passenger tram in 1979. Construction and testing of the new tram were completed in February 1980, and the red and yellow tram cars are still running year-round today.

Around 1940, actress Bette Davis vacationed in Sugar Hill, the town bordering Franconia to the west. On a solo hike to Bridal Veil Falls at the western foot of Cannon Mountain, she got lost in the woods. Arthur Farnsworth, who worked at Peckett's Ski School, found her and rescued her from the woods. They fell in love and soon married. Farnsworth died unexpectedly as a result of freak accident in Los Angeles. Davis had erected in a rock on the trail to Bridal Veil Falls a plaque to commemorate Farnsworth, in which was inscribed the words "The Keeper of Stray Ladies", although Davis did not include her name in the plaque. The plaque can be seen today on the Coppermine Trail to Bridal Veil Falls.

The town was home to Franconia College during the 1960s and 1970s. In the 21st century Franconia has been known as the home of skier Bode Miller who has accumulated several Olympic medals.

Geography

Franconia is drained by the Pemigewasset River, the Franconia Branch of the East Branch Pemigewasset River, the Gale River, and the Ham Branch of the Gale River, in addition to Lafayette Brook. The north-western two-thirds of Franconia lies within the Connecticut River watershed, while the southeastern portion which drains to the Pemigewasset and its branches lies in the Merrimack River watershed.

The area of Franconia Notch is well known for its natural features, including Profile and Echo lakes, the Basin, Mount Lafayette, Mount Lincoln, and Cannon Mountain. The Old Man of the Mountain, a profile-like cliff on the side of Cannon Mountain which inspired Nathaniel Hawthorne to write "The Great Stone Face", collapsed on May 3, 2003.

In addition to the mountains around Franconia Notch, there are several other four-thousand footers within the town limits:  Mount Garfield, Galehead Mountain, South Twin Mountain, and Owl's Head.

Demographics

As of the census of 2000, there were 924 people, 384 households, and 243 families residing in the town.  The population density was 14.0 people per square mile (5.4/km2).  There were 702 housing units at an average density of 10.7 per square mile (4.1/km2).  The racial makeup of the town was 97.51% White, 0.11% African American, 0.65% Native American, 0.87% Asian, 0.11% from other races, and 0.76% from two or more races. Hispanic or Latino of any race were 0.32% of the population.

There were 384 households, out of which 27.1% had children under the age of 18 living with them, 53.4% were married couples living together, 7.8% had a female householder with no husband present, and 36.7% were non-families. 28.9% of all households were made up of individuals, and 8.6% had someone living alone who was 65 years of age or older.  The average household size was 2.23 and the average family size was 2.76.

In the town, the population was spread out, with 20.0% under the age of 18, 4.5% from 18 to 24, 21.9% from 25 to 44, 33.1% from 45 to 64, and 20.5% who were 65 years of age or older.  The median age was 47 years. For every 100 females, there were 88.6 males.  For every 100 females age 18 and over, there were 82.5 males.

The median income for a household in the town was $40,114, and the median income for a family was $46,979. Males had a median income of $29,500 versus $24,000 for females. The per capita income for the town was $20,351.  About 7.8% of families and 8.9% of the population were below the poverty line, including 10.1% of those under age 18 and 4.9% of those age 65 or over.

Sites of interest
 The Frost Place, former home of poet Robert Frost
 New England Ski Museum
 Franconia Notch State Park & Cannon Mt Aerial Tramway
 Bridal Veil Falls
 Profile House
 Franconia Iron Works

Notable people 

 Elisabeth Elliot (1926–2015), Christian author, speaker
 Jessica Garretson Finch (1871–1949), daughter of minister of the Congregational Church in Franconia, suffragette, founder of Finch College
 Robert Frost (1874–1963), four time Pulitzer Prize-winning poet
 Sel Hannah (1913–1991), skier, ski area architect 
 Bode Miller (born 1977), Olympic gold medalist skier
 Ernest Poole (1880–1950), author
 Annie Trumbull Slosson (1838–1926), author, entomologist

References

External links
 
 
 
 New Hampshire Economic and Labor Market Information Bureau Profile
 Franconia Notch Regional Chamber of Commerce

 
Towns in Grafton County, New Hampshire
Towns in New Hampshire
1764 establishments in New Hampshire